The 2015–16 UNC Greensboro Spartans men's basketball team represented the University of North Carolina at Greensboro during the 2015–16 NCAA Division I men's basketball season. The Spartans, led by fifth year head coach Wes Miller, play their home games at the Greensboro Coliseum, with two home games at Fleming Gymnasium, and are members of the Southern Conference. They finished the season 15–19, 10–8 in SoCon play to finish in a tie for fifth place. They lost in the quarterfinals of the SoCon tournament to Furman. They were invited to the College Basketball Invitational where they defeated Houston Baptist in the first round before losing in the quarterfinals to Ohio.

Roster

Schedule

|-
!colspan=9 style="background:#003366; color:#FFCC00;"| Regular season

|-
!colspan=9 style="background:#003366; color:#FFCC00;"| SoCon tournament

|-
!colspan=9 style="background:#003366; color:#FFCC00;"| CBI

References

UNC Greensboro Spartans men's basketball seasons
UNC Greensboro
2015 in sports in North Carolina
2016 in sports in North Carolina
UNC Greensboro